The Invisible Fear is a lost 1921 American silent mystery film directed by Edwin Carewe and starring Anita Stewart. It was produced by Stewart and Louis B. Mayer with release through First National Pictures.

Plot
As described in a film magazine, Sylvia Langdon (Stewart) is engaged to Bentley Arnold (Forrest). Her hand is also sought by Arthur Comstock (McGrail), a nephew of John Randall (Crane), who is a partner of Marshall Arnold (Morse). Sylvia accompanies Arthur on a paper chase from the country club but is thrown from her horse. A storm overtakes them and they seek refuge in a lodge. Here Arthur attempts to make love to Sylvia and during a violet quarrel she hits him on the head with a heavy candlestick. She flees from the lodge and, turning back, finds it engulfed in flames. John Randall discovers that Arthur has taken a will from his desk and sets out to find him. An accident happens and Randall is reported killed. Sylvia and Bentley are married. She gives a party on her birthday at which Arthur Comstock appears. She is transfixed with horror at the sight of him and runs to her room where she finds the candlestick on her dresser. That night, hypnotized by candle holder, she opens the family safe and takes out the jewels. Arthur seizes them but is in turn seized by detectives that had been hidden in the house by Bentley. A confession from the Japanese butler Nagi (Kuwa) reveals that Arthur Comstock murdered Randall and left his body to be consumed in the lodge fire. Sylvia is just freed from the invisible fear that she had killed Arthur.

Cast
Anita Stewart as Sylvia Langdon
Walter McGrail as Arthur Comstock
Allan Forrest as Bentley Arnold
Hamilton Morse as Marshall Arnold
Estelle Evans as Mrs. Marshall Arnold
George Kuwa as Nagi
Edward Hunt as Butler
Ogden Crane as John Randall

References

External links

1921 films
American silent feature films
Films directed by Edwin Carewe
Lost American films
First National Pictures films
American black-and-white films
American mystery films
1921 mystery films
1921 lost films
Lost mystery films
1920s American films
Silent mystery films